This page covers all the important events in the sport of tennis in 2015. Primarily, it provides the results of notable tournaments throughout the year on both the ATP and WTA Tours, the Davis Cup, and the Fed Cup.

ITF

Grand Slam events

Davis Cup

Fed Cup

IOC

 June 6-14: Southeast Asian Games
 July 10-16: Pan American Games

Important events

January
The Australian Open along with five ATP tournaments, five WTA tournaments, the Hopman Cup, were scheduled in January.
Polish duo Jerzy Janowicz and Agnieszka Radwańska defeated United States in the Hopman Cup Final to give Poland its first Hopman Cup victory.
Roger Federer secured his 1,000th match win, along with his 83rd career title, by defeating Milos Raonic in three sets in the final of Brisbane International.

February

2015 in tennis results

Association of Tennis Professionals (ATP)
 January 4 – November 29: 2015 ATP World Tour
 November 15 – 22: 2015 ATP World Tour Finals in  London
 Men's Singles:  Novak Djokovic
 Men's Doubles:  Jean-Julien Rojer /  Horia Tecău

ATP World Tour Masters 1000
 March 12 – November 8: 2015 ATP World Tour Masters 1000 Tournament
 March 12 – 22: 2015 BNP Paribas Open in  Indian Wells, California
 Men's Singles:  Novak Djokovic
 Men's Doubles:  Vasek Pospisil /  Jack Sock
 Men's Singles:  Novak Djokovic
 Men's Doubles:  Bob Bryan /  Mike Bryan
 Men's Singles:  Novak Djokovic
 Men's Doubles:  Bob Bryan /  Mike Bryan
 May 3 – 10: 2015 Mutua Madrid Open in 
 Men's Singles:  Andy Murray
 Men's Doubles:  Rohan Bopanna /  Florin Mergea
 May 11 – 18: 2015 Internazionali BNL d'Italia in  Rome
 Men's Singles:  Novak Djokovic
 Men's Doubles:  Pablo Cuevas /  David Marrero
 August 10 – 16: 2015 Rogers Cup for men in  Montreal
 Men's Singles:  Andy Murray
 Men's Doubles:  Bob Bryan /  Mike Bryan
 August 17 – 23: 2015 Western & Southern Open in  Mason, Ohio (Cincinnati)
 Men's Singles:  Roger Federer
 Men's Doubles:  Daniel Nestor /  Édouard Roger-Vasselin
 October 11 – 18: 2015 Shanghai Rolex Masters in 
 Men's Singles:  Novak Djokovic
 Men's Doubles:  Raven Klaasen /  Marcelo Melo
 November 2 – 8: 2015 BNP Paribas Masters in  Paris (final)
 Men's Singles:  Novak Djokovic
 Men's Doubles:  Ivan Dodig /  Marcelo Melo

ATP World Tour 500 series
 February 9 – November 1: 2015 ATP World Tour 500 Series
 February 9–15: 2015 ABN AMRO World Tennis Tournament
 Men's Singles:  Stan Wawrinka
 Men's Doubles:  Jean-Julien Rojer /  Horia Tecău
 February 16–22: 2015 Rio Open
 Men's Singles:  David Ferrer
 Men's Doubles:  Martin Kližan /  Philipp Oswald
 February 23–28: 2015 Dubai Tennis Championships
 Men's Singles:  Roger Federer
 Men's Doubles:  Rohan Bopanna /  Daniel Nestor
 February 23–28: 2015 Abierto Mexicano Telcel
 Men's Singles:  Kei Nishikori
 Men's Doubles:  Ivan Dodig /  Marcelo Melo
 April 20–26: 2015 Barcelona Open Banc Sabadell
 Men's Singles:  Kei Nishikori
 Men's Doubles:  Marin Draganja /  Henri Kontinen
 June 15–21: 2015 Gerry Weber Open
 Men's Singles:  Roger Federer
 Men's Doubles:  Raven Klaasen /  Rajeev Ram
 June 15–21: 2015 Aegon Championships
 Men's Singles:  Andy Murray
 Men's Doubles:  Pierre-Hugues Herbert /  Nicolas Mahut
 July 27–August 2: 2015 International German Open
 Men's Singles:  Rafael Nadal
 Men's Doubles:  Jamie Murray /  John Peers
 August 3–9: 2015 Citi Open
 Men's Singles:  Kei Nishikori
 Men's Doubles:  Bob Bryan /  Mike Bryan
 October 5–11: 2015 China Open
 Men's Singles:  Novak Djokovic
 Men's Doubles:  Vasek Pospisil /  Jack Sock
 October 5–11: 2015 Rakuten Japan Open Tennis Championships
 Men's Singles:  Stan Wawrinka
 Men's Doubles:  Raven Klaasen /  Marcelo Melo
 October 19–25: 2015 Erste Bank Open
 Men's Singles:  David Ferrer
 Men's Doubles:  Łukasz Kubot /  Marcelo Melo
 October 26–November 1: 2015 Swiss Indoors
 Men's Singles:  Roger Federer
 Men's Doubles:  Alexander Peya /  Bruno Soares

ATP World Tour 250 series
 January 4 – November 1: 2015 ATP World Tour 250 Series
 January
 January 4–11: 2015 Brisbane International
 Men's Singles:  Roger Federer
 Men's Doubles:  Jamie Murray /  John Peers
 January 5–11: 2015 Aircel Chennai Open
 Men's Singles:  Stan Wawrinka
 Men's Doubles:  Yen-hsun Lu /  Jonathan Marray
 January 5–11: 2015 Qatar ExxonMobil Open
 Men's Singles:  David Ferrer
 Men's Doubles:  Juan Mónaco /  Rafael Nadal
 January 11–17: 2015 Apia International Sydney
 Men's Singles:  Viktor Troicki
 Men's Doubles:  Rohan Bopanna /  Daniel Nestor
 January 12–17: 2015 Heineken Open
 Men's Singles:  Jiří Veselý
 Men's Doubles:  Raven Klaasen /  Leander Paes
 February
 February 2–8: 2015 Ecuador Open Quito (debut event)
 Men's Singles:  Víctor Estrella Burgos
 Men's Doubles:  Gero Kretschmer /  Alexander Satschko
 February 2–8: 2015 Open Sud de France
 Men's Singles:  Richard Gasquet
 Men's Doubles:  Marcus Daniell /  Artem Sitak
 February 2–8: 2015 PBZ Zagreb Indoors
 Men's Singles:  Guillermo García-López
 Men's Doubles:  Marin Draganja /  Henri Kontinen
 February 9–15: 2015 Brasil Open
 Men's Singles:  Pablo Cuevas
 Men's Doubles:  Juan Sebastián Cabal /  Robert Farah Maksoud
 February 9–15: 2015 Memphis Open
 Men's Singles:  Kei Nishikori
 Men's Doubles:  Mariusz Fyrstenberg /  Santiago González
 February 16–22: 2015 Delray Beach Open 
 Men's Singles:  Ivo Karlović
 Men's Doubles:  Bob Bryan /  Mike Bryan
 February 16–22: 2015 Open 13
 Men's Singles:  Gilles Simon
 Men's Doubles:  Marin Draganja /  Henri Kontinen
 February 23–March 1: 2015 Argentina Open
 Men's Singles:  Rafael Nadal
 Men's Doubles:  Jarkko Nieminen /  André Sá
 April
 April 6–12: 2015 Grand Prix Hassan II
 Men's Singles:  Martin Kližan
 Men's Doubles:  Rameez Junaid /  Adil Shamasdin
 April 6–12: 2015 U.S. Men's Clay Court Championships
 Men's Singles:  Jack Sock
 Men's Doubles:  Ričardas Berankis /  Teymuraz Gabashvili
 April 20–26: 2015 BRD Năstase Țiriac Trophy
 Men's Singles:  Jiří Veselý
 Men's Doubles:  Marius Copil /  Adrian Ungur
 April 27–May 3: 2015 BMW Open
 Men's Singles:  Andy Murray
 Men's Doubles:  Alexander Peya /  Bruno Soares
 April 27–May 3: 2015 Estoril Open
 Men's Singles:  Richard Gasquet
 Men's Doubles:  Treat Huey /  Scott Lipsky
 April 27–May 3: Istanbul Open (debut event)
 Men's Singles:  Roger Federer
 Men's Doubles:  Radu Albot /  Dušan Lajović
 May
 May 17–23: 2015 Open de Nice Côte d'Azur
 Men's Singles:  Dominic Thiem
 Men's Doubles:  Mate Pavić /  Michael Venus
 May 17–23: 2015 Geneva Open (returned to ATP World Tour)
 Men's Singles:  Thomaz Bellucci
 Men's Doubles:  Juan Sebastián Cabal /  Robert Farah Maksoud
 June
 June 8–14: 2015 Topshelf Open
 Men's Singles:  Nicolas Mahut
 Men's Doubles:  Ivo Karlović /  Łukasz Kubot
 June 8–14: 2015 MercedesCup
 Men's Singles:  Rafael Nadal
 Men's Doubles:  Rohan Bopanna /  Florin Mergea
 June 21–27: 2015 Aegon Open Nottingham
 Men's Singles:  Denis Istomin
 Men's Doubles:  Chris Guccione /  André Sá
 July
 July 13–19: 2015 Hall of Fame Tennis Championships
 Men's Singles:  Rajeev Ram
 Men's Doubles:  Jonathan Marray /  Aisam-ul-Haq Qureshi
 July 20–26: 2015 Swedish Open
 Men's Singles:  Benoît Paire
 Men's Doubles:  Jérémy Chardy /  Łukasz Kubot
 July 20–26: 2015 Claro Open Colombia
 Men's Singles:  Bernard Tomic
 Men's Doubles:  Édouard Roger-Vasselin /  Radek Štěpánek
 July 20–26: 2015 Croatia Open Umag
 Men's Singles:  Dominic Thiem
 Men's Doubles:  Máximo González /  André Sá
 July 27–August 2: 2015 Swiss Open Gstaad
 Men's Singles:  Dominic Thiem
 Men's Doubles:  Aliaksandr Bury /  Denis Istomin
 July 27–August 2: 2015 BB&T Atlanta Open
 Men's Singles:  John Isner
 Men's Doubles:  Bob Bryan /  Mike Bryan
 August
 August 3–8: 2015 Generali Open Kitzbühel
 Men's Singles:  Philipp Kohlschreiber
 Men's Doubles:  Nicolás Almagro /  Carlos Berlocq
 August 23–30: 2015 Winston-Salem Open
 Men's Singles:  Kevin Anderson
 Men's Doubles:  Dominic Inglot /  Robert Lindstedt
 September
 September 21–27: 2015 Moselle Open
 Men's Singles:  Jo-Wilfried Tsonga
 Men's Doubles:  Łukasz Kubot /  Édouard Roger-Vasselin
 September 21–27: 2015 St. Petersburg Open
 Men's Singles:  Milos Raonic
 Men's Doubles:  Treat Huey /  Henri Kontinen
 September 28–October 4: 2015 Malaysian Open, Kuala Lumpur
 Men's Singles:  David Ferrer
 Men's Doubles:  Treat Huey /  Henri Kontinen
 September 28–October 4: 2015 ATP Shenzhen Open
 Men's Singles:  Tomáš Berdych
 Men's Doubles:  Jonathan Erlich /  Colin Fleming
 October
 October 19–25: 2015 Stockholm Open
 Men's Singles:  Tomáš Berdych
 Men's Doubles:  Nicholas Monroe /  Jack Sock
 October 19–25: 2015 Kremlin Cup
 Men's Singles:  Marin Čilić
 Men's Doubles:  Andrey Rublev /  Dmitry Tursunov
 October 26–November 1: 2015 Valencia Open (final)
 Men's Singles:  João Sousa
 Men's Doubles:  Eric Butorac /  Scott Lipsky

ATP Champions Tour (Senior Men)
 February 13 – December 6: 2015 ATP Champions Tour
 February 13 – 15: 2015 Delray Beach Open in the 
 Team International ( Mark Philippoussis,  Goran Ivanišević, and  Mikael Pernfors) defeated Team USA ( James Blake,  Brad Gilbert, and  Justin Gimelstob) 6–3.
 August 13 – 16: 2015 Optima Open in  Knokke-Heist
  Xavier Malisse defeated  Pete Sampras 6–7 (5), 7–5, 13–11, in the final.
 October 8 – 11: 2015 Reyes Del Tenis in  Majorca
  Àlex Corretja defeated  Thomas Enqvist 3–6, 6–4, 10–7, in the final.
 October 24 & 25: 2015 Kia Motors Champions Cup Tennis in  Seoul (debut event)
  Fernando González defeated  Michael Chang 7–6 and 6–2, in the final.
 October 27 – 29: 2015 Monterrey Open in 
  Pete Sampras defeated fellow American, John McEnroe, 6–3 and 7–6, in the final.
 November 20 – 22: 2015 La Grande Sfida in  Modena / Verona
  John McEnroe defeated  Sergi Bruguera, 6–3 and 6–4, in the final.
 December 2 – 6: 2015 Champions Tennis at the Royal Albert Hall in  London (final)
  Fernando González defeated  Tim Henman, 1–6, 7–6, and 10–6, in the final.

Women's Tennis Association (WTA)
 January 4 – November 8: 2015 WTA Tour
 July 27 – August 2: Zhonghong Jiangxi International Women's Open in  Nanchang
 Women's Singles:  Jelena Janković
 Women's Doubles:  Chang Kai-chen /  Zheng Saisai
 October 25 – November 1: 2015 WTA Finals in 
 Women's Singles:  Agnieszka Radwańska
 Women's Doubles:  Martina Hingis /  Sania Mirza
 November 2 – 8: 2015 WTA Elite Trophy in  Zhuhai (debut event and replaces the WTA Tournament of Champions)
 Women's Singles:  Venus Williams
 Women's Doubles:  Liang Chen /  Wang Yafan

WTA Premier tournaments
 January 4 – October 24: 2015 WTA Premier tournaments
 January 4–11: 2015 Brisbane International
 Women's Singles:  Maria Sharapova
 Women's Doubles:  Martina Hingis /  Sabine Lisicki
 January 11–17: 2015 Apia International Sydney
 Women's Singles:  Petra Kvitová
 Women's Doubles:  Bethanie Mattek-Sands /  Sania Mirza
 February 9–15: 2015 Diamond Games
 Women's Singles:  Andrea Petkovic
 Women's Doubles:  Anabel Medina Garrigues /  Arantxa Parra Santonja
 February 23–28: 2015 Qatar Total Open
 Women's Singles:  Lucie Šafářová
 Women's Doubles:  Raquel Kops-Jones /  Abigail Spears
 April 6–12: 2015 Family Circle Cup
 Women's Singles:  Angelique Kerber
 Women's Doubles:  Martina Hingis /  Sania Mirza
 April 20–26: 2015 Porsche Tennis Grand Prix
 Women's Singles:  Angelique Kerber
 Women's Doubles:  Bethanie Mattek-Sands /  Lucie Šafářová
 June 15–21: 2015 Aegon Classic
 Women's Singles:  Angelique Kerber
 Women's Doubles:  Garbiñe Muguruza /  Carla Suárez Navarro
 June 21–27: 2015 Aegon International
 Women's Singles:  Belinda Bencic
 Women's Doubles:  Caroline Garcia /  Katarina Srebotnik
 August 3–9: 2015 Bank of the West Classic
 Women's Singles:  Angelique Kerber
 Women's Doubles:  Xu Yifan /  Zheng Saisai
 August 23–29: 2015 Connecticut Open
 Women's Singles:  Petra Kvitová
 Women's Doubles:  Julia Görges /  Lucie Hradecká
 September 21–27: 2015 Toray Pan Pacific Open
 Women's Singles:  Agnieszka Radwańska
 Women's Doubles:  Garbiñe Muguruza /  Carla Suárez Navarro
 October 19–24: 2015 Kremlin Cup 
 Women's Singles:  Svetlana Kuznetsova
 Women's Doubles:  Daria Kasatkina /  Elena Vesnina

WTA International tournaments
 January 4 – October 25: 2015 WTA International tournaments
 January
 January 4–10: 2015 Shenzhen Open
 Women's Singles:  Simona Halep
 Women's Doubles:  Lyudmyla Kichenok /  Nadiia Kichenok
 January 5–10: 2015 ASB Classic
 Women's Singles:  Venus Williams
 Women's Doubles:  Sara Errani /  Roberta Vinci
 January 11–17: 2015 Hobart International
 Women's Singles:  Heather Watson
 Women's Doubles:  Kiki Bertens /  Johanna Larsson
 February
 February 9–15: 2015 PTT Pattaya Open
 Women's Singles:  Daniela Hantuchová
 Women's Doubles:  Chan Hao-ching /  Chan Yung-jan
 February 16–22: 2015 Rio Open
 Women's Singles:  Sara Errani
 Women's Doubles:  Ysaline Bonaventure /  Rebecca Peterson
 February 23–28: 2015 Abierto Mexicano Telcel
 Women's Singles:  Timea Bacsinszky
 Women's Doubles:  Lara Arruabarrena /  María Teresa Torró Flor
 March
 March 2–8: 2015 Abierto Monterrey Afirme
 Women's Singles:  Timea Bacsinszky
 Women's Doubles:  Gabriela Dabrowski /  Alicja Rosolska
 March 2–8: 2015 BMW Malaysian Open
 Women's Singles:  Caroline Wozniacki
 Women's Doubles:  Liang Chen /  Wang Yafan
 April
 April 6–12: 2015 Katowice Open
 Women's Singles:  Anna Karolína Schmiedlová
 Women's Doubles:  Ysaline Bonaventure /  Demi Schuurs
 April 13–19: 2015 Copa Colsanitas
 Women's Singles:  Teliana Pereira
 Women's Doubles:  Paula Cristina Gonçalves /  Beatriz Haddad Maia
 April 27–May 2: 2015 Grand Prix SAR La Princesse Lalla Meryem
 Women's Singles:  Elina Svitolina
 Women's Doubles:  Tímea Babos /  Kristina Mladenovic
 April 27–May 2: 2015 Sparta Prague Open
 Women's Singles:  Karolína Plíšková
 Women's Doubles:  Belinda Bencic /  Kateřina Siniaková
 May
 May 17–23: 2015 Internationaux de Strasbourg
 Women's Singles:  Samantha Stosur
 Women's Doubles:  Chuang Chia-jung /  Liang Chen
 May 17–23: 2015 Nürnberger Versicherungscup
 Women's Singles:  Karin Knapp
 Women's Doubles:  Chan Hao-ching /  Anabel Medina Garrigues
 June
 June 8–14: 2015 Aegon Open Nottingham
 Women's Singles:  Ana Konjuh
 Women's Doubles:  Raquel Kops-Jones /  Abigail Spears
 June 8–14: 2015 Topshelf Open
 Women's Singles:  Camila Giorgi
 Women's Doubles:  Asia Muhammad /  Laura Siegemund
 July
 July 13–19: 2015 BRD Bucharest Open
 Women's Singles:  Anna Karolína Schmiedlová
 Women's Doubles:  Oksana Kalashnikova /  Demi Schuurs
 July 13–19: 2015 Swedish Open
 Women's Singles:  Johanna Larsson
 Women's Doubles:  Kiki Bertens /  Johanna Larsson
 July 20–26: 2015 Gastein Ladies
 Women's Singles:  Samantha Stosur
 Women's Doubles:  Danka Kovinić /  Stephanie Vogt
 July 20–26: 2015 İstanbul Cup
 Women's Singles:  Lesia Tsurenko
 Women's Doubles:  Daria Gavrilova /  Elina Svitolina
 July 27–August 1: 2015 Brasil Tennis Cup
 Women's Singles:  Teliana Pereira
 Women's Doubles:  Annika Beck /  Laura Siegemund
 July 27–August 2: 2015 Baku Cup
 Women's Singles:  Margarita Gasparyan
 Women's Doubles:  Margarita Gasparyan /  Alexandra Panova
 August
 August 3–9: 2015 Citi Open
 Women's Singles:  Sloane Stephens
 Women's Doubles:  Belinda Bencic /  Kristina Mladenovic
 September
 September 14–20: 2015 Coupe Banque Nationale
 Women's Singles:  Annika Beck
 Women's Doubles:  Barbora Krejčíková /  An-Sophie Mestach
 September 14–20: 2015 Japan Women's Open
 Women's Singles:  Yanina Wickmayer
 Women's Doubles:  Chan Hao-ching /  Chan Yung-jan
 September 21–27: 2015 Guangzhou International Women's Open
 Women's Singles:  Jelena Janković
 Women's Doubles:  Martina Hingis /  Sania Mirza
 September 21–27: 2015 Korea Open
 Women's Singles:  Irina-Camelia Begu
 Women's Doubles:  Lara Arruabarrena /  Andreja Klepač
 September 28–October 3: 2015 Tashkent Open
 Women's Singles:  Nao Hibino
 Women's Doubles:  Margarita Gasparyan /  Alexandra Panova
 October
 October 12–18: 2015 Tianjin Open
 Women's Singles:  Agnieszka Radwańska
 Women's Doubles:  Xu Yifan /  Zheng Saisai
 October 12–18: 2015 Hong Kong Tennis Open
 Women's Singles:  Jelena Janković
 Women's Doubles:  Alizé Cornet /  Yaroslava Shvedova
 October 12–18: 2015 Generali Ladies Linz
 Women's Singles:  Anastasia Pavlyuchenkova
 Women's Doubles:  Raquel Kops-Jones /  Abigail Spears
 October 19–25: 2015 BGL Luxembourg Open
 Women's Singles:  Misaki Doi
 Women's Doubles:  Mona Barthel /  Laura Siegemund

Premier Mandatory events
 March 11 – October 11: 2015 WTA Premier Mandatory events
 March 11 – 22: 2015 BNP Paribas Open
 Women's Singles:  Simona Halep
 Women's Doubles:  Martina Hingis /  Sania Mirza
 March 24 – April 5: 2015 Miami Open
 Women's Singles:  Serena Williams
 Women's Doubles:  Martina Hingis /  Sania Mirza
 May 2 – 10: 2015 Mutua Madrid Open
 Women's Singles:  Petra Kvitová
 Women's Doubles:  Casey Dellacqua /  Yaroslava Shvedova
 October 3 – 11: 2015 China Open in  Beijing
 Women's Singles:  Garbiñe Muguruza
 Women's Doubles:  Martina Hingis /  Sania Mirza

Premier 5 events
 February 15 – October 3: 2015 WTA Premier 5 events
 February 15 – 21: 2015 Dubai Tennis Championships in the 
 Women's Singles:  Simona Halep
 Women's Doubles:  Tímea Babos /  Kristina Mladenovic
 May 12 – 18: 2015 Internazionali BNL d'Italia
 Women's Singles:  Maria Sharapova
 Women's Doubles:  Tímea Babos /  Kristina Mladenovic
 August 8 – 16: 2015 Rogers Cup for women in  Toronto
 Women's Singles:  Belinda Bencic
 Women's Doubles:  Bethanie Mattek-Sands /  Lucie Šafářová
 August 17 – 23: 2015 Western & Southern Open
 Women's Singles:  Serena Williams
 Women's Doubles:  Chan Hao-ching /  Chan Yung-jan
 September 27 – October 3: 2015 Wuhan Open in 
 Women's Singles:  Venus Williams
 Women's Doubles:  Martina Hingis /  Sania Mirza

Other tennis events
 January 4 – 10: 2015 Hopman Cup in  Perth
 February 7 – November 15: 2015 Fed Cup
 The  defeated , 3–2, to win their ninth Fed Cup title. 
 March 6 – November 29: 2015 Davis Cup
  defeated , 3–1, to win their tenth Davis Cup title.
 May 25 – 31: 2015 BNP Paribas World Team Cup (wheelchair tennis) in  Antalya
 Men's World Group #1 winners:  (Gordon Reid, Marc McCarroll, Dave Phillipson, Alfie Hewett)
 Men's World Group #2 winners:  (Daniel Caverzaschi, Martin de la Puente, Roberto Chamizo, Françesc Tur)[
 Women's World Group winners:  (Jiske Griffioen, Aniek van Koot, Diede de Groot)
 Quad World Group winners:  (David Wagner, Nick Taylor, Greg Hasterok, Bryan Barten)
 Juniors World Group winners:  (Christopher Herman, Conner Stroud, Casey Ratzlaff)
 August 2: 2015 World TeamTennis Finals in  Washington, D.C.
 The Washington Kastles defeated the Austin Aces, 24–18 in extended play, to win their fifth straight King Trophy as WTT champions.
 November 3 – 7: 2015 UNIQLO Wheelchair Doubles Masters in  Mission Viejo, California
 Men's Doubles winners:  Stéphane Houdet /  Joachim Gérard
 Women's Doubles winners:  Jiske Griffioen /  Aniek van Koot
 Quad Doubles winners:  Nicholas Taylor /  David Wagner
 December 2 – 6: 2015 NEC Wheelchair Tennis Masters (singles) in  London
 Men's Singles winner:  Joachim Gérard
 Women's Singles winner:  Jiske Griffioen
 Quads Singles winner:  David Wagner
 Team  Singapore Slammers defeated Team  Indian Aces, 26–21, to win their first International Premier Tennis League title. 
 December 10 – 12: Brazil Masters Cup in  Rio de Janeiro (Olympic and Paralympic Test Event)
 Men's Singles winner:  Thiago Monteiro
 Men's Wheelchair Singles winner:  Daniel Rodrigues
 Women's Singles winner:  Gabriela Cé
 Women's Wheelchair Singles winner:  Natalia Mayara

International Tennis Hall of Fame
Class of 2015:
David Hall, player
Amélie Mauresmo, player
Nancy Jeffett, contributor

References

External links
Official website of the Association of Tennis Professionals (ATP)
Official website of the Women's Tennis Association (WTA)
Official website of the International Tennis Federation (ITF)
Official website of the International Team Competition in Men's Tennis (Davis Cup)
Official website of the International Team Competition in Women's Tennis (Fed Cup)

 
Tennis by year